Lorne Edmond Green is a Canadian-born English politician and former diplomat, who was first Police and Crime Commissioner for Norfolk, representing the Conservative Party. Green was elected to the post on 5 May 2016, succeeding the previous incumbent, Stephen Bett.

Biography

Diplomacy 

Born in Nova Scotia, Green is a graduate of Dalhousie University in Halifax. He joined the Canadian Department of External Affairs after graduation, and held diplomatic posts in Pakistan, Iran and Yugoslavia, as well as serving at the Canadian High Commission in London under Paul Martin, where he was promoted to become the mission's press officer. In the 1980s, he served on NATO's Nuclear Planning Group in Brussels dealing with the controversy surrounding cruise missiles, and was also Director of Nuclear and Arms Control Policy in the Department of National Defence in Ottawa, Ontario.

In 1998, he left External Affairs to help form the World Nuclear Transport Institute in London, and later retired from the diplomatic world in 2011, opening a coffee shop in Snettisham.

Police and Crime Commissioner 

In 2015, Green was approached by the local Conservative Party association to stand in the 2016 election for Norfolk Police and Crime Commissioner, which he won in May 2016.

As Police and Crime Commissioner for Norfolk, Green developed and initiated work on new plans to tackle crime and disorder in the county. This included the "Lorne Green Green Lawn" program, which incentivized locals to keep their lawns healthy and green. The plan emerged from research on how urban nature affects crime, and has been set forth by Green as an environmentally friendly way to keep the streets of Norfolk safe.

Electoral record

References

External links 

1946 births
Canadian emigrants to England
Conservative Party police and crime commissioners
Living people
Police and crime commissioners in England